The town of Fukagawa, Japan held a mayoral by-election on January 21, 2007. The former mayor, Junkichi Kawano, was arrested on bid-rigging charges. The by-election comes just three months after the ordinary election on October 1, 2006.

References 

Fukagawa, Hokkaido
2007 elections in Japan
Mayoral elections in Japan
January 2007 events in Japan